Hermine Haselböck (born 7 March 1967 in Melk, Lower Austria) is an Austrian mezzo-soprano in opera, concert and lied.

Career 
After graduating from Stiftsgymnasium Melk Haselböck studied with Rita Streich at the Vienna Music Academy and continued at the Hochschule für Musik Detmold, with Ingeborg Ruß, finishing with diplomas for both performing and vocal education. She received further vocal training by Brigitte Fassbaender, Sena Jurinac, Marjana Lipovšek, Christa Ludwig and Eva Randová, and took master classes with Kurt Equiluz, Kurt Widmer and Edith Sélig-Papée.

Her operatic career began with the role of Mercedes in Carmen, when Nikolaus Harnoncourt discovered her for his production at styriarte in 2005. She performed Dorabella (Così fan tutte) at the Concertgebouw Amsterdam, and the Second Lady (The Magic Flute) at the Mozart Festival Reinsberg, the Theater an der Wien and the Grand Théâtre de Luxembourg. 2006 she sang the role Frauenschatten in Erwin Schulhoff's Flammen. Two trouser roles followed, Hansel (Hansel and Gretel, Volksoper Wien) and Ramiro (La finta giardiniera, National Opera Tokyo and Bruckner Festival Linz). 2009 she first sang Magdalene (Die Meistersinger von Nürnberg), 2012 Brangäne (Tristan und Isolde) and 2013 Azucena (Il Trovatore) at the Tyrolian Festival Erl and Gertrud/Mother, (Hansel and Gretel at the Graz Opera House. 2013 she debuted as Floßhilde (Rheingold) in the Sala Santa Cecilia in Rome and made 2014 her debut as Fricka in  Das Rheingold and Die Walküre at the Tyrolian Festival Erl, Austria. 2015 she performed Flosshilde in Das Rheingold with the Hong Kong Philharmonic Orchestra under the conduct of Jaap van Zweden. In 2015, she was singing the role of Fricka at the first staged performance of Das Rheingold and Die Walküre in Beijing and Shanghai. In 2016 followed the role of the daughter in the Austrian premiere of Ella Milch-Sheriff's Baruchs Schweigen at the EntarteOpera Festival, Vienna.

Haselböck has collaborated with orchestras such as the Wiener Symphoniker, the Münchner Philharmoniker, the Orchestra dell'Accademia Nazionale di Santa Cecilia, the Orchestre National de Lille, the RSO Vienna, the MDR Sinfonieorchester, the Hongkong Philharmonic Orchestra, the Residence Orchestra Den Haag, the Dresdner Philharmonie, Budapest Philharmonic Orchestra, and under conductors such as Bertrand de Billy, Vladimir Fedoseyev, Rafael Frühbeck de Burgos, Martin Haselböck, Manfred Honeck, Gustav Kuhn, Fabio Luisi, Kirill Petrenko, Martin Sieghart, Jean-Christophe Spinosi, Christian Thielemann, Franz Welser-Möst, Jaap van Zweden.

Symphonic and lieder repertoire plays an important role, performed in the Brucknerhaus Linz, Carnegie Hall, Frauenkirche in Dresden, Gewandhaus, Konzerthaus Vienna, Mozarteum Salzburg, Musikverein Vienna, Musée d'Orsay, Paris, and Teatro San Carlo Naples. Her repertoire includes the major works by Bach, Haydn, Händel, Mendelssohn, Beethoven, Mahler, Mozart, Schubert, Zemlinsky (Maeterlinck Songs), Wagner (Wesendoncklieder) and Verdi (Requiem).

Haselböck is Guest Professor for Voice at the University of Music and Performing Arts Graz.

Awards 
In 2005, Haselböck was awarded for her debut CD "Songs by Zemlinsky" the International Zemlinsky Award at the Musikverein Vienna and the Pasticcio Prize of the Austrian classical radio station.

In 2014, Haselböck's  CD recording of Gustav Mahler's Lieder eines fahrenden Gesellen, Kindertotenlieder, Rückert Lieder, Russell Ryan, piano, 2011: bridge records 9341 received the SUPER SONIC classic music award of the magazin PIZZICATO, Luxemburg.

Discography 
Gustav Mahler: Symphony No. 2, Orchestre National de Lille, C: Jean-Claude Casadesus, Olena Tokar, soprano, Philharmonic Choir of Brno, Petr Fiala, 2016, EVIDENCE EVCD027
Richard Wagner, Das Rheingold, (Flosshilde), Hong Kong Philharmonic Orchestra, Jaap van Zweden, Matthias Goerne, Michelle De Young, Peter Sidhom, Kwangchul Youn, Stephen Milling, Kim Begley, Anna Samuil, David Cangelosi, Deborah Humble, Oleksandr Pushniak, Eri Nakamura, 2015 NAXOS 8.660374-75
Gustav Mahler: Lieder eines fahrenden Gesellen, Kindertotenlieder, Rückert Lieder, Russell Ryan, piano, 2011: bridge records 9341
Gustav Mahler:	Lieder-Collectors edition, with Elisabeth Flechl, soprano, Wolfgang Holzmair, baritone, Alexander Kaimbacher, tenor, Angelika Kirchschlager, mezzo-soprano, Michael Kraus, baritone, Daniel Schmutzhard, baritone, Birgid Steinberger, soprano, Christopher Hinterhuber and Russell Ryan, piano, Christian Fennesz: Mahler Remix, Visuals: Annablume, Victoria Coeln, lia, Lillevan, lwz, Valence. 2011, Music DVD, departure 711956
Hugo Wolf Lieder: Lieder-Collectors edition, with Birgid Steinberger, soprano, Bernhard Berchtold, tenor, Florian Boesch, bass-baritone, Wolfgang Holzmair, baritone, Angelika Kirchschlager, mezzo-soprano, Michaela Selinger, mezzo-soprano; Georg Beckmann and Russell Ryan, piano, visuals: Victoria Coeln, Timo Novotny, luma.launisch (sound:frame lab), Claudia Rohrmoser; 2011, music DVD, departure 711760
Gustav Mahler: Das Lied von der Erde, with Bernhard Berchtold, tenor, Markus Vorzellner, piano original version for piano and high or middle voice. 2009: c-avi records 4260085531257
Ludwig van Beethoven: Missa Solemnis, Haydn Orchestre Bozen/Trient, D: Gustav Kuhn), 2007: col legno 60011
Songs of Franz Schreker, with Wolfgang Holzmair, baritone, Russel Ryan, piano, 2007: bridge records 9259
Songs of Alexander Zemlinsky with Florian Henschel, piano, 2006 2nd edition bridge records 9244
Songs of Alexander Zemlinsky with Florian Henschel, piano, 2003: panclassics pc 10162
Franz Schubert: Mass in A-flat major, Spirit of Europe, Martin Sieghart, 2007. orf-n cd 034
Ludwig van Beethoven: Symphony No. 9, Haydn Orchestra of Bozen and Trient, D: Gustav Kuhn), 2006:col legno 60005
Gaetano Donizetti: Adelia, (Odetta), Haydn Orchestra Bozen and Trient, D: Gustav Kuhn
George Frideric Handel: Judas Maccabeus, Barucco Kammerorchester, D: Heinz Ferlesch, 2006 orf sacd 2010059

References

Sources
WWW.FORUMOPERA.COM - Jean-Marcel Humbert, 5.8.2014 (Rhine Gold and Valkyrie) >>
„... Hermine Haselböck, a magnificent Fricka, has enormously developed further since her Brangäne 2012, her voice has gained homogeneity and roundness and she is as person and stage appearance an excellent actress with strong presence ...“
THE OPERATIC MUSICOLOGIST - Daniel Url 12.7.2015 >>
„As Brangäne Hermine Haselböck once again impressed me with her powerful and still very beautiful voice. She has the perfect voice for Wagner's demanding mezzo roles and has a very warm tender timbre. Her guarding song during the love scene in act 2 was magic and lured the audience into another world. Also her diction is really exemplary and impressively precise.“ The Operatic Musicologist
Holland, Bernhard (9 September 2006). "A Taste of Vienna, Flavored by Yesterday and Tomorrow". New York Times
Rosenblum, Joshua (March 2012). Recording review: Hermine Haselböck and Russell Ryan: "Mahler: Lieder Eines Fahrenden Gesellen; Rückert-Lieder; Kindertotenlieder". Opera News
Schweitzer, Vivien (29 March 2007). "Smaller Songs, Large in Spirit". New York Times
Bayley, Lynn René  (10 December 2012)  MAHLER Songs of a Wayfarer. Rückert Lieder. Kindertotenlieder.
White, Bill (10 December 2012)     MAHLER Songs of a Wayfarer. Rückert Lieder. Kindertotenlieder
Dubins, Jerry, (9 December 2012)  SCHREKER Songs.
White, Bill (9 December 2012)   ZEMLINSKY songs.
White, Bill (20 September 2012)  Interview
Vous avez cherché hermine haselböck, Alain Steffen, review Mahler song CD, SUPER SONIC classic music award 2014
Earnest singing and dramatic insight in Das Rheingold

External links

Hermine Haselböck Italartist Austroconcert
„Rheingold“: Richard Wagner erobert Rom

Living people
Austrian operatic mezzo-sopranos
1967 births
Hochschule für Musik Detmold alumni
People from Lower Austria